Arnstein Finstad (born 21 March 1978) is a Norwegian cross-country skier.

He made his World Cup debut in March 2002 in Oslo, and collected his first World Cup points with a 27th place in Stockholm in February 2004. One week later he finished 19th in Drammen. He has only competed in sprint events.

He represents the sports club Steinkjer SK, and lives in Steinkjer.

Cross-country skiing results
All results are sourced from the International Ski Federation (FIS).

World Cup

Season standings

References

Norwegian male cross-country skiers
People from Steinkjer
1978 births
Living people
Sportspeople from Trøndelag